The High School I.E.S. Mariano Quintanilla, Segovia is a state High School in Segovia, Spain, Europe. It is one of the oldest High Schools in Spain. The main building is one of the best examples of Modernist architecture in Spain, regarded as Bien de Interés Cultural (Piece of cultural interest). Its architects were Joaquín Odriozola and Antonio Bermejo.

Notable alumni

 Marqués de Lozoya, historian, art critic and writer.
 Mariano Quintanilla
 María Zambrano, philosopher
jose juan español de la fuente

Notable Teachers 
 Epifanio Ralero, Latinist
 Salvador Velayos, physicist.
 Salvador Calderón, naturalist.
 Rafael Breñosa, geologist.
 Norberto Cuesta Dutari, mathemátician.
 Carlos Sahagún Beltrán, poet.
 Antonio Machado, poet.

Language exchanges
The I.E.S. Mariano Quintanilla has been doing international scholar exchanges since the early 1990s. For example, a school with which they frequently hold exchanges is Marysville High School (Ohio), in Marysville, Ohio. There have also been several exchanges with foreign French-speaking schools, such as in Tours, (France).

Websites 

 Mariano Quintanilla

Secondary schools in Spain